Naria miliaris, common name the millet cowry or the inocellate cowry or the military cowry,  is a species of sea snail, a cowry, a marine gastropod mollusk in the family Cypraeidae, the cowries.

Description
The dorsum surface of these smooth and shiny shells is generally pale brown or yellowish, with several small white spots. The base is white or pink, with several fine teeth. In the living cowries the mantle is pale brown and greyish, with long tree-shaped sensorial papillae. This species is quite similar to Naria lamarckii, but in Naria miliaris the edges of the shell are white, without any spots.

Distribution
This species is distributed in the Indian Ocean along Madagascar and Tanzania and in the western Pacific Ocean to Australia, along Japan, East China, Taiwan, Vietnam, East Thailand, East Malaysia, Flores, North Borneo, Java, Philippines and northwestern Australia.

References

 Burgess, C.M. (1970). The Living Cowries. AS Barnes and Co, Ltd. Cranbury, New Jersey
 Dautzenberg, Ph. (1929). Mollusques testaces marins de Madagascar. Faune des Colonies Francaises, Tome III
 Verdcourt, B. (1960). The cowries of the East African Coast: Supplement III. JEANHS XXIII (104): 281-285.

External links
 Biolib
 Flmnh

Cypraeidae
Gastropods described in 1791
Taxa named by Johann Friedrich Gmelin